The Wingate Memorial Trophy was the award given to the United States Intercollegiate Lacrosse Association (USILA) national champion in men's college lacrosse from 1936 to 1970, and the NCAA Men's Champion in 1971-1972.

The first intercollegiate lacrosse tournament was held in 1881, with Harvard beating Princeton 3-0 in the championship game. From this point through 1970, USILA and the collegiate lacrosse associations from which it evolved - the ILA (1882-1905), IULL (1894-1905), USILL (1906-1925) and USILA (1926-1970) - chose the annual champions based on season records.  In 1936, the family of W. Wilson Wingate, a longtime Baltimore sportswriter who had played the sport in college and often covered it, donated a memorial trophy in his name to be presented to the USILA champion. Wingate is credited with nicknaming lacrosse "the fastest game on two feet."

The NCAA held its first NCAA Men's Lacrosse Championship in 1971. The Wingate Memorial Trophy was presented to the first two NCAA champions, and retired following the 1972 season. Currently, the NCAA tournament annually determines the top lacrosse teams in Division I, Division II, and Division III.

Wingate Memorial Trophy winners

Team championship records

Championships by state

References

See also
United States Intercollegiate Lacrosse Association
NCAA Men's Lacrosse Championship

College lacrosse competitions in the United States
College lacrosse trophies and awards in the United States